The International Metallic Silhouette Shooting Union (IMSSU) is the international organization for metallic silhouette shooting, which was founded in 1992 in response to the fact that rules for metallic silhouette shooting started to diverge around the world.

The European regional body is Association Européenne de Tir sur Silhouettes Métalliques (AETSM), which means European Metallic Silhouette Shooting Association

History 
The International Metallic Silhouette Shooting Union was founded on 8 October 1992 in Paris, with founding members from Australia, Belgium, France, the Netherlands, New Zealand, South Africa, Switzerland, the USA and the European silhouette federation AETSM. Michel Boulanger was elected as the first president along with Jean-Pierre Beurtheret as the first secretary.

It was established a competition ruleset which could only be revised every fourth year to give stability to the sport. The first IMSSU competition ruleset was largely based on the NRA metallic silhouette competition rules, but since 1997 NRA has published silhouette rules which differ from IMSSU.

Member associations 
As of 2020 IMSSU has 26 member regions.

See also 
 List of shooting sports organizations
 International Handgun Metallic Silhouette Association (IHMSA)

References

Shooting sports organizations
International sports organizations
Handgun shooting sports
Rifle shooting sports